Inversión y Finanzas is a weekly Spanish finance and business magazine published in Madrid, Spain.

Profile
Inversión y Finanzas was launched in 1993. It is part of Grupo Vocento and is published by Invensor Ediciones S.L. on a weekly basis. Its headquarters is in Madrid. The magazine features articles on economy and stock market.

Inversión y Finanzas had a circulation of 8,300 copies in 2012. In 2014 the circulation of the magazine was 4,641 copies.

References

External links
 Official website
 WorldCat record

1993 establishments in Spain
Business magazines published in Spain
Magazines established in 1993
Magazines published in Madrid
Spanish-language magazines
Weekly magazines published in Spain